Patissa tenuousa is a moth in the family Crambidae. It was described by Fu-Qiang Chen, Shi-Mei Song and Chun-Sheng Wu in 2007. It is found in Sichuan, China.

The forewings are white with thin fuscous fasciae.

References

Moths described in 2007
Schoenobiinae